Nileh may refer to:
 Nileh, Lorestan
 Nir, Yazd
 Nileh Safid